The 49th New Brunswick Legislative Assembly was created following a general election in 1978. It was dissolved on September 1, 1982.

Leadership

Robert McCready was chosen as speaker in 1979 even though he had been elected as a Liberal member. James Tucker succeeded McCready as speaker in 1981.

Premier Richard Hatfield led the government. The Progressive Conservative Party was the ruling party.

List of Members 

Notes:

See also
1978 New Brunswick general election
Legislative Assembly of New Brunswick

References 
 Canadian Parliamentary Guide, 1981, PG Normandin

Terms of the New Brunswick Legislature
1978 establishments in New Brunswick
1982 disestablishments in New Brunswick
20th century in New Brunswick